Toltén River is a river located in the La Araucanía Region of Chile. It rises at Villarrica Lake, close to the city of the same name. Its major tributary is the Allipén River. From its confluence with the Allipén, the river follows a braided course.

After flowing for about 123 km, the river reaches the Pacific Ocean near Punta Nilhue, where it is about 500 m wide.

Cities and towns along the Toltén include: Villarrica, Pitrufquén, Teodoro Schmidt and Nueva Toltén.

References

External links 

 Toltén River Map
Other coordinates: 

Rivers of Araucanía Region
Rivers of Chile